Rich Nigga Timeline (censored, marketed as and on cover Rich Ni**a Timeline) is the fifth mixtape by American hip hop group Migos, released on November 5, 2014. Rolling Stone named Rich Nigga Timeline as the seventh Best Rap Album of 2014. It features production by Cassius Jay, Cheeze, Deko, DeeMoney, DJ Durel, Mario Beats, Murda Beatz, Phenom Da Don, StackboyTwaun, Swift Bangs, TM88 and Zaytoven.

Rolling Stone voted it the 7th-best rap album of 2014.

Track listing

References

2014 mixtape albums
Albums produced by Murda Beatz
Albums produced by Zaytoven
Migos albums
Quality Control Music albums
Albums produced by TM88